Dimitrios Panagiannousis (Servia, 1750 – 1828) was a Metropolitan of Belgrade and Budapest. He was also known as Popovic or Popovikis (the name Popovic was the most common attributive for Greek immigrants in Hungary). He was ordained Metropolitan of Belgrade in 1783 and of Buda in 1790.

References

Sources 
 "Συμβολή στην Ιστορία της Επαρχίας Σερβίων κατά την περίοδο 1350-1912", by Athanasios G. Tsarmanidis, Servia: Μορφωτικός Ομιλος Σερβίων «Τα Κάστρα», 1995.

Greek theologians
Scholars in Eastern Orthodoxy
People from Servia
1750 births
1828 deaths